The Altai birch mouse (Sicista napaea) is a species of rodent in the family Sminthidae. It is native to Russia and Kazakhstan. A baby Altai birch mouse is called a 'pinkie, kitten or pup'. The females are called 'doe' and males 'buck'. A Altai birch mouse group is called a 'nest, colony, harvest, horde or mischief'.

References

Further reading
Holden, M. E. and G. G. Musser. 2005. Family Dipodidae. pp. 871–893 in Mammal Species of the World: A Taxonomic and Geographic Reference. D. E. Wilson and D. M. Reeder, eds. Johns Hopkins University Press, Baltimore.
https://www.researchgate.net/publication/286722260_An_integrative_systematic_revision_of_the_European_southern_birch_mice_Rodentia_Sminthidae_Sicista_subtilis_group

Sicista
Mammals of Russia
Mammals of Central Asia
Taxonomy articles created by Polbot
Mammals described in 1912